William Sturm (1906–1981) was an animator, known for character development with Fleischer Animation
Studios.  Most notably, he was known for animating characters such as Popeye and Bluto. After leaving Fleischer Studios he
once again worked with Max Fleischer at Jam Handy Films in Detroit creating animation for the original cartoon of Rudolph the Red
Nosed Reindeer in 1948.

Filmography
I Eats My Spinach
Grampy's Indoor Outing
Rudolph the Red Nosed Reindeer

External links
 https://www.loc.gov/exhibits/cartoonamerica/cartoon-zip.html
 

1906 births
1981 deaths
American animators
Fleischer Studios people